Stuart MacLeod may refer to:

Stuart MacLeod (magician) 
Stuart MacLeod (musician), Australian guitarist in Eskimo Joe